Clover (stylized as CLOVER) is a manga series created by Clamp, a creative team made up by Satsuki Igarashi, Nanase Ohkawa, Tsubaki Nekoi, and Mokona. The manga takes place in a dystopian future, where the government is out to control the "Clovers", a race of children with special powers.

Clover was serialized in Kodansha's Amie from 1997 until the magazine's demise in 1999. Kodansha Comics released the entire series in English as one hardcover volume in 2020.

Plot
Clover is primarily about a young girl called , whose name was stated to be derived from the Chinese word for four (sì) since she is a "4-leaf Clover". In the futuristic world that she inhabits, the military conducted a search for gifted children nicknamed "Clovers", who seemingly have the magical ability to manipulate technology. Demonstrations of their powers include teleportation and summoning weapons from thin air.

Classified according to how powerful they are, the children were then tattooed with a symbol of the Clover Project, with the number of leaves on the Clover indicating their power. To date, Sue is the only "4-leaf Clover" discovered. Along with other "Clovers", Sue was imprisoned to prevent her contact with other humans, as the government feared that she might develop feelings and be used as a weapon to jeopardize the country's national security.

Being isolated from the rest of mankind, Sue craves for company, and as for her only wish, she asks to visit "Fairy Park." Her escort is Kazuhiko, an ex-military soldier who has been forced to undertake the task. It is later revealed that Kazuhiko and Sue are connected through Kazuhiko's deceased lover, .

Development
The manga was conceived as a four-part story. The first two volumes comprise part I and trace the main story in the present. The following two volumes are parts II and III, and are flashbacks which explain the history behind certain incidents. According to series head writer Nanase Ohkawa, two further books are needed to complete the story.

Release
Clover was serialized in Kodansha's Amie from 1997 until the magazine's demise in 1999, and remains unfinished. Kodansha collected the chapters into four volumes. The first was published on June 6, 1997; the final was released on August 9, 1999. Kodansha re-released the series in two volumes on July 17, 2008.

Clover was licensed for an English-language release in North America by Tokyopop. It published the series from May 15, 2001 to March 20, 2002, but let the series go out of print on May 2, 2005. Dark Horse Manga picked up the license, combining the series into one volume in its original right-to-left format and releasing it on May 13, 2009.
The series is also licensed in French by Pika Édition, and in German by Carlsen Comics.

After Dark Horse Comics' license expired, Kodansha Comics licensed it and began releasing the series, combining into one hardcover volume in 2020.

Volume list

Media
A Clover animated music video based on the prologue chapters of the manga was produced by Bandai Visual and Madhouse Studios and shown in Japanese theaters before the Cardcaptor Sakura film in 1999. It is directed by Kitarō Kōsaka, with Nobuteru Yūki designing the characters and Ichiko Hashimoto composing the music. The short film was released to DVD as part of the Clamp in Wonderland collection on October 26, 2007.

Dark Horse Comics, who previously held the license for the distribution of the English North American edition of the manga, were in negotiations with Universal Studios for the rights to develop a movie based upon the manga. However, as of 2022, nothing from this has materialized.

Reception
Rika Takahashi, from EX: The Online World of Manga, noted the work's stark contrast with other, more positive CLAMP works such as Cardcaptor Sakura and Wish. She stated that it was a fast-pace drama similar to works such X and Tokyo Babylon. She commented on CLAMP's choice of presenting the story in short sequences and in a style "where the frames break out of the typical 'grid'" and to produce an experience of watching a movie on paper. She also commented that the typesetting of the sound effects helped create the overall cold mood unlike other CLAMP works. Furthermore, she praised the work for retaining a high detail of the art without being too dense.

Kisei from Tokidoki Journal praised Clover for having a sense of beauty due to its empty space and simplicity, which help give the manga and characters a mood of "chilling isolation," a stark contrast from CLAMP's previous works which Kisei said feature highly detailed pages that make reading difficult and "cheerful bubbly" female protagonists. Kisei further praised the work for, instead of defining the characters, using art to express their personalities and traits. Further praising it as a work that would draw both female and male audiences with its romance and military aspects, Kisei stated that the only flaw with the work was its high price.

Casey Brienza of Anime News Network remarks that the series is "arguably the best artwork of CLAMP's career" and has "gorgeous production values" but that "pretentious poetry conceals a thin plot and even thinner characterization."

A Publishers Weekly review felt that reading the series is like, "looking into a dystopic future through one tiny, perfectly square frame." The same reviewer said that the character designs were "magnificent" and that, "the tiny details on the clockwork birds and imaginative effects are stunning." The reviewer felt that though it was obviously an experimental work for CLAMP, that the series would be widely liked.

Notes

References

External links
 
 Nakayoshi's CLAMP Page
 "Shojo Manga Pick of the Month"

1997 manga
1999 anime films
Works by Clamp (manga artists)
Cyberpunk anime and manga
Dark Horse Comics titles
Fantasy anime and manga
Kodansha manga
Madhouse (company)
Manga series
Shōjo manga
Tokyopop titles